Chiang Mai Night Safari is located in the sub-district of Mae Hia in Chiang Mai, and the district Nong Khwai, and the district Hang Dong. The zoo is located west of Royal Park Rajapruek. Chiang Mai Night Safari is a government property under the Zoological Park Organization. The park was opened for the first time on the 18th of November 2005 and opened officially on the 6 February 2006. Initially, it was under  and the Pinkanakorn Development Agency (Public Organization). Chiang Mai Night Safari is believed to be the first nocturnal zoo in Thailand and is the largest in the world, covering an area of 819 Rai. Presently Chiang Mai Night Safari has changed its opening hours so that tourists can enter during both the day and night.

In Chiang Mai Night Safari there are some areas where non-dangerous animals are able to roam freely where tourists are able to get up close and personal to the animals. From the entry gate up to the main building there are wild deer and muntjac roaming around, they are also seen around the north and south tour zones.

History
The Chiang Mai Night Safari was envisioned by Prime Minister Thaksin Shinawatra. He had a vision for starting up a nocturnal zoo, due to wanting to have a quality and popular tourist attraction, like that which was achieved by Singapore and also had become world-famous. Once the Prime Minister had this vision, he had brought it to the attention of Kosin Ketthong, the Governor of Chiang Mai at the time in order to find an appropriate place to start building. There were many places proposed, such as the forest areas of the Doi Saket District, but eventually, they settled upon an area at the foot of Doi Suthep, being the most ideal area which was located in the sub-district of Mae Hia, Chiang Mai. It was also in the Doi Suthep-Pui National Park area, having a terrain that was better than Singapore.

The Prime Minister received approval No.90/2545 on the 25th of March 2002 and started a Chiang Mai Night Zoo Establishment Study Committee and Related Activities for Tourism Promotion. A resolution was passed through the cabinet on 28 October 2003. They received approval for the budget of the "Chiang Mai Night Safari" project in the amount of 1,155.9 million baht distributed to the Ministry of Natural Resources and Environment by the Department of National Parks, Wildlife and Plant Conservation in order to start construction.

On 9 September 2004, the government was granted order number 224/2547 in order to start the Chiang Mai Night Safari Administration Office, with Prodprasob Surasawadee as its director, and having the Chiang Mai Night Safari as an institute under the Special Area Development for Sustainable Tourism.

On 14 April 2019, the government under Prime Minister Prayut Chan-o-cha has a resolved to dissolve the Pinkanakorn Development Agency that supervises and manage Chiang Mai Night Safari and turn the command to the Zoological Park Organization under Ministry of Natural Resources and Environment.

Zones
Chiang Mai Night Safari is separated into the following zones:

For tourists 

 Main Building: Shops, meeting rooms, activity areas, animal viewing points.
 Lake: At night there are shows and the only place to see a dancing fountain in Thailand.
 The Giraffe Restaurant: The zoo's restaurant, that serves both a la carte and buffet.
 Resort Hotel: hotel rooms for tourists to stay overnight.

Attractions 

 The Jaguar Trail Zone: a 1.2 kilometer walk around the lake, inside the zone includes.
 Digital Zoo: Shows brought to live through technology.
 Kids Zone: Children's playground and play area.
 Tiger World: Includes a variety of tigers from around the world.
 The Predator Prowl Zone (North): a zone that contains carnivorous animals
 Savannah Safari Zone (South): a zone that contains herbivorous animals

Resort
The resort at Chiang Mai Night Safari is composed of five houses :
 Kum Payaa is a one-story house located in a forest.
 Piroon Pana is a group of houses consisting of 8 independent units in a forest with all facilities.
 Safari Doii is a one-story house consisting of 3-4 independent units in a forest with all necessities.
 Phrueksa Sawan is a one-story house consisting of 3-4 independent units in a forest with all necessities.
 Puang Chompoo is a one-story house consisting of 3-4 independent units in a forest with all necessities.

Activities
Digital Zoo: The digital Zoo has many technology based attractions including an interactive wall, an interactive floor, a laser gun game, 3D puppets, holograms, piano steps, and a multi touch table.

Night Safari: The Night Safari is a combination of 2 bus tours that drive around the zoo during the night. The two tours include the Predator Prowl and the Savannah Safari. This tour is exclusive to view some nocturnal animals.

Day Safari: The Day Safari is a tram ride through the zoo during the day. Tourist are also able to feed the animals during the ride.

Behind the Zoo: Behind the Zoo is an activity consisting of taking care of animals including the "Big 5" (elephants, hippopotamus, bison, white rhinoceros and giraffes). The activities will give insight to what it is like caring for these animals.

Jaguar Trail Zone: the Jaguar Trail is a 1.2 kilometer walking track around the lake. There are many animals alongside the track for viewing their behaviour.

Musical fountain
The Chiang Mai Night Safari has a multimedia musical fountain show. The fountain itself is 30 x 6 meters. The fountain consists of 1,200 water jets that are capable of creating a variety of water effects. The fountain is  capable of creating a 40 meter wide and 15 meter high water screen with video and laser projectors capable of projecting on it. The project was built by the Emotion Media Factory.

For King Bhumibol Adulyadej's 60th coronation anniversary, a special programme was shown for the event. The show included a video, lights and lasers set to music that was composed by the king. The Prime Minister, Thaksin Shinawatra was thoroughly impressed with the show, he congratulated the managing directors, Helmut Dörner and Ralph Douw (Emotion Media Factory), on their excellent work.

Gallery

See also
Chiang Mai Zoo
Fountain
Musical fountain
AIDA Cruises
Romon U-Park

References

External links

 

Buildings and structures in Chiang Mai
Tourist attractions in Chiang Mai
Zoos in Thailand
2006 establishments in Thailand
Zoos established in 2006
Fountains in Asia
2000s in Chiang Mai